Post Oak Creek is a stream in Johnson County in the U.S. state of Missouri.

It flows north passing under U.S. Route 50.

Post Oak Creek was named for the post oak trees near its course.

See also
List of rivers of Missouri

References

Rivers of Johnson County, Missouri
Rivers of Missouri